W. & D. Downey were Victorian studio photographers operating in London from the 1860s to the 1910s.

William Downey (14 July 1829 in South Shields – 7 July 1915 in Kensington), who came to be known as the Queen's Photographer, was born in King Street in South Shields, a decade before commercial photography had become a reality. William, initially, was a carpenter and boatbuilder, but in about 1855 he set up a studio in South Shields with his brother Daniel Downey ( 1831 – 15 July 1881) and later established branches in Blyth, Morpeth and Newcastle. Their first Royal commission was to provide photographs for Queen Victoria of the Hartley Colliery Disaster in January 1862.

In 1863 they opened a studio at 9, Eldon Square in Newcastle, in a building that was demolished in 1973. The same year William set up a studio in the Houses of Parliament and produced portraits of every parliamentarian of the day. The resulting images' location is unknown to this day.

William moved to 57 & 61 Ebury Street in London in 1872 and opened another studio, his brother managing the Newcastle branch. The London studio enjoyed the patronage of Queen Victoria and the Prince of Wales, taking photos at Balmoral and Frogmore during the 1860s. The studio's first Royal image was of the Princess of Wales at the York Agricultural Show in 1865. The studio also produced the iconic carte-de-visite portrait of the Princess of Wales piggybacking Princess Louise. The studio received a Royal Warrant in 1879.

Downey used Joseph Swan's carbon process for their best work. In the 1880s Mawson, Swan & Morgan of Newcastle, was the world's largest manufacturer of photographic dry plates, the convenience of which made photography a commercial reality. George Eastman spent some time there during the eighties and afterwards invented the Box Brownie and roll film, ending the monopoly of studios on permanent images.

William Downey's son, William Edward Downey (1855–1908), managed most of the royal sittings during the Edwardian era. Gladys Cooper, a child photographic model of the time, reminisces about the Downeys in her autobiography:     

William senior was married to Lucy, who had been born in Speenhamland, Berkshire in 1843, and they had one son and one daughter. He joined the Photographic Society (later The Royal Photographic Society) in December 1870. The 1891 and 1901 census records show that he was living at 10 Nevern Square, Warwick Road, Earl's Court, Kensington. Downey's prized silver collection was stolen from his Earl's Court home in November 1914 – the burglary is said to have brought on his death.

William Downey senior was William Fowler Downey and he married Caroline Griffiths of Cheshire. They had two sons, William Edward and Robert Ingham (who died an infant). Caroline died in 1874 and William remarried Lucy Lyon in 1877.  Their children were Arthur James Hope and Laura Evelyn.

Arthur, as A.J.H. Downey, continued the family business: his work included a portrait of King George V's children in 1910, the year of their father's accession.

Daniel Downey married Elizabeth Smith Beloe and had three children, another Robert Ingham Downey, Elizabeth and Victoria Christine. Daniel died in Bethnal House, Bethnal Green on 15 July 1881.

References

Bibliography
The Cabinet Portrait Gallery, London: Cassell & Co., 1890–94 5 vols., 4to, with 180 mounted photographs by W. & D. Downey
A grand old photographer, series of 10 weekly articles in Pall Mall Budget 1 January – 19 March 1891, illus 
Our Royal photographs – How they were taken, Pall Mall Budget 26 July 1894 p 13, photo, interview with William Downey 
Mr William Downey, the grand old man of photography, Evening News 12 October 1895 p 1, port; 
Mr W. Downey, the Queen's photographer, English Illustrated Magazine March 1896 pp 643 – 652, illus 
W. E. L Animated photographs at Windsor Castle 23 November 1896, Lady's Pictorial 5 December 1896, special supplement showing Queen Victoria with her guests including the Tsar and Tsarina of Russia.  
The doyen of photographers – Mr Wm Downey of Messrs W & D Downey, Ebury Street, S W, Professional Photographer Vol 1 1906 pp 10 – 14, illus 
Forty years a Royal photographer, British Journal of Photography, 29 November 1907 pp 902 – 903, illus 
Obituary, British Journal of Photography 16 July 1915

External links

Photographers in Victorian London – Collection of Roger F.Vaughan
W. & D. Downey – Collection of Roger F.Vaughan
The Royal Collection
Exhibitions of the Royal Photographic Society 1870–1915
King Edward VII and his family
Portrait of Alexandra of Denmark; Princess Victoria Alexandra Olga Mary of Wales

Photographic studios
British portrait photographers
Business duos
Photographers from London
19th-century English photographers
Photography companies of England
Photographers from Northumberland